The Fours is a sports bar with locations in Quincy and Norwell, Massachusetts. The now-closed Boston location was voted the best sports bar in the United States by Sports Illustrated in 2005. It was established in 1976. It was noted to be a rare late-night option for the South Shore by the Boston Globe in 2009.

References

External links
The Fours.com

Restaurants in Boston
Restaurants established in 1976
1976 establishments in Massachusetts